Ervis Koçi (born 13 November 1984) is an Albanian professional footballer who most recently played as a goalkeeper for Kukësi in the Albanian Superliga.

Club career
He is the club's current longest serving player, having been a member of the squad since 2009 when they were playing in the Albanian Second Division, the third tier of Albanian football. Kukësi was promoted after finished second in the 2011–12 Albanian First Division and Koçi was rewarded with a new contract for his performances. He signed a contract for the 2012–13 season, the club's first ever top flight season.

Koçi was dropped to second choice in the 2012–13 following the acquisition of Argjent Halili, making only one appearance in league. That appearance came on 4 May 2013 in the penultimate matchday versus Kastrioti Krujë, keeping a clean sheet in the 0–3. He did, however, made 4 cup appearances as Kukësi was eliminated in semi-finals to Laçi.

Career statistics

Honours
Kukësi
Albanian Superliga: 2016–17
Albanian Cup: 2015–16
Albanian Supercup: 2016

References

External links

1984 births
Living people
People from Kukës
Albanian footballers
Association football goalkeepers
Kategoria Superiore players
Kategoria e Parë players
Besëlidhja Lezhë players
FK Kukësi players
KS Kastrioti players